The Baronetcy of Lisheen, County Tipperary, was created in the Baronetage of the United Kingdom on 5 August 1801 for Col. Thomas Judkin-Fitzgerald (Uniacke), who had adopted the surname of Judkin in compliance with the will of his maternal uncle Judge John Lapp Judkin, of Cashel. The title was a reward for suppressing the United Irish Rebellion of 1798 in Co Tipperary as High Sheriff of Tipperary. 
On his death in 1810, in a "criminatory obituary" and in reference to his excessive use of the cat o' nine tails at this time, it was said that "The history of his life and loyalty is written in legible characters on the backs of his fellow countrymen."

He was succeeded by his son, Sir John, the second Baronet John who also went on to becoming Mayor of Cashel and High Sheriff of Tipperary, the latter during the last year of King George III reign 1819, then by his grandson the third Baronet, Sir Thomas who also was a magistrate and Deputy Lieutenant for the County Tipperary. With the death of the fourth Baronet in 1917, the baronetcy became apparently extinct or dormant.

Judkin-Fitzgerald baronets, of Lisheen (1801)
Sir Thomas Judkin-Fitzgerald, 1st Baronet (1754–1810) High Sheriff of Tipperary 1798
Sir John Judkin-Fitzgerald, 2nd Baronet (1787–1860) High Sheriff of Tipperary 1819, Mayor of Cashel, died aboard the PS Nimrod.
Sir Thomas Judkin-Fitzgerald, 3rd Baronet (1820–1864), magistrate and Deputy Lieutenant for the County Tipperary, 27 April Sir Thomas Judkin Fitzgerald. his residence "Golden Hills" was named after the townland in which it was located Golden Hills, near the village of Golden, in the barony of Clanwilliam (County Tipperary). Dr. Matthew S. Kennedy. Death from temporary insanity. Reported by Thomas Mack. Source: A return of inquisitions held by the coroner for the South Riding of the County of Tipperary commencing 1st Feb 1864 and ending June 1864.
Sir Joseph Capel Judkin-Fitzgerald, 4th Baronet (1853–1917)

Heraldic insignia

Ancestry

References

Oxford Dictionary of National Biography: Robert Dunlop, ‘Fitzgerald, Sir Thomas Judkin-, first baronet (1754–1810)’, rev. Thomas P. Power, first published September 2004, 670 words
An Historical Review of the State of Ireland from the Invasion of that ... By Francis Plowden (1806) Printed and published by W. F. McLaughlin and Bartholomew Graves, Ireland v.5
A Complete Collection of State Trials and Proceedings for High Treason and Other Crimes and Misdemeanors Compiled by Thomas Bayly Howell (1820) Longman, Hurst, Rees, Orme and Brown v. 27 (1798–1800)
 The History of Ireland: From Its Invasion Under Henry II. to Its Union with ... By Francis Plowden (1812) v.2 p452 incl Judkin-Fitzgerald's visits to Dublin Castle and subsequent capitulation by Francis Arthur Esq on board Minerva Captd & witnessed by Joseph Salkeld, Mate Henry Harrison which also transported United Irish Wicklow General Joseph Holt (rebel) Holt Fellowship

Extinct baronetcies in the Baronetage of the United Kingdom
People from County Tipperary
Nobility from County Limerick
People from County Louth
People from County Cork
People from County Waterford
People from County Wexford